Dimitar Valentinov Velkovski (born 22 January 1995) is a Bulgarian professional footballer who plays as a left-back or winger for Ekstraklasa club Miedź Legnica and the Bulgaria national team.

Club career
Velkovski started his career at home-town club Botev Vratsa, joining their youth system as a six-year-old.

In June 2018, Velkovski signed with Slavia Sofia.

On 31 January 2020, he signed a three-and-a-half-year contract with Belgian First Division A side Cercle Brugge.

On 14 February 2023, Velkovski moved to Polish Ekstraklasa side Miedź Legnica, signing a deal until the end of the season.

International career
He made his national team debut on 11 October 2020 in a Nations League game against Finland.

Club statistics

Club

References

External links

Living people
1995 births
People from Vratsa
Bulgarian footballers
Bulgaria youth international footballers
Bulgaria under-21 international footballers
Bulgaria international footballers
Association football fullbacks
Association football midfielders
FC Lokomotiv 1929 Sofia players
PFC Lokomotiv Plovdiv players
PFC Slavia Sofia players
Cercle Brugge K.S.V. players
Miedź Legnica players
First Professional Football League (Bulgaria) players
Belgian Pro League players
Bulgarian expatriate footballers
Expatriate footballers in Belgium
Expatriate footballers in Poland
Bulgarian expatriate sportspeople in Belgium
Bulgarian expatriate sportspeople in Poland